Luigi Maldera (19 January 1946 – 5 November 2021) was an Italian football coach and player who made more than 400 appearances in the Italian professional leagues playing as a defender. He played five seasons (92 games, 4 goals) in Serie A for Hellas Verona, A.C. Milan and Catanzaro.

His younger brothers Attilio Maldera and Aldo Maldera played football professionally. To distinguish them, Luigi was referred to as Maldera I, Attilio as Maldera II and Aldo as Maldera III.

Honours
Milan
 European Cup: 1968–69
 Intercontinental Cup: 1969

References

1946 births
2021 deaths
Italian footballers
Association football defenders
Hellas Verona F.C. players
A.C. Monza players
A.C. Milan players
U.S. Catanzaro 1929 players
Piacenza Calcio 1919 players
Italian football managers
U.S. 1913 Seregno Calcio players
Serie A players
Serie B players
Sportspeople from the Metropolitan City of Bari
Footballers from Apulia